Frank Aloysius "Dink" O'Brien (September 13, 1894 – November 4, 1971) was a professional baseball player.  He was a catcher for one season (1923) with the Philadelphia Phillies.  For his career, he compiled a .333 batting average in 21 at-bats.

O'Brien was born in San Francisco, California and later died in Monterey Park, California at the age of 77.

External links

1894 births
1971 deaths
Philadelphia Phillies players
Major League Baseball catchers
Baseball players from California
San Francisco Seals (baseball) players
Portland Beavers players
Tulsa Oilers (baseball) players
Galveston Pirates players
Terre Haute Tots players
Decatur Commodores players
Birmingham Barons players
Harrisburg Senators players
Cedar Rapids Bunnies players
Rock Island Islanders players
Waterloo Hawks (baseball) players
Burials at Willamette National Cemetery